Huernia macrocarpa is a colorful succulent plant related to the milkweeds. This beautiful plant grows to a height of five or six meters, extending fleshy, toothed arms, dark pink star-shaped flowers and small eyes. It is commonly kept as a potted houseplant.

References

macrocarpa
House plants